The Calyptraeidae are a family of small to medium-sized marine prosobranch gastropods. 

This family includes the slipper snails (Crepidula species), the Chinese hat snails, (Calyptraea species), and the cup-and-saucer snails (Crucibulum species) among others.

The Calyptraeidae are the only family in the superfamily Calyptraeoidea. This family has no subfamilies according to the taxonomy of the Gastropoda by Bouchet & Rocroi, 2005.

Crepidula fornicata was brought to Europe on imported American oysters in the late 19th century and is now considered a significant pest in European oyster beds.

Description 
Internally, the shell is distinguished by a shelf-like, cup-like, or half-cup-like structure used for muscle attachment.  Some calyptraeids have shells that externally resemble those of limpets, so species in the genus Crepidula are often called slipper limpets.  However, these snails are not closely related to true limpets and are more closely related to conches and cowries. The "slipper" in the name "slipper limpet" is based on the appearance of the inside of the shell, which with its half-shelf resembles a traditional western bedroom slipper.

Reproduction 
Calyptraeids may form a tower of up to 25 animals, sometimes referred to as a mating chain.  The bottom snail is always female.  When she dies, the male above her will change from male to female, and the chain continues.

Genera 

Genera within the family Calyptraeidae include:
 Bicatillus Swainson, 1840
 Bostrycapulus Olsson & Harbison, 1953
 Calyptraea Lamarck, 1799
 Crepidula Lamarck, 1799
 Crepipatella Lesson, 1831
 Crucibulum Schumacher, 1817
 Desmaulus Rehder, 1943
 Ergaea H. Adams & A. Adams, 1854
 Grandicrepidula McLean, 1995
 Maoricrypta Finlay, 1926
 Sigapatella Lesson, 1930
 † Taimyroconus Guzhov, 2015 
 Trochita Schumacher, 1817

Genera brought into synonymy 
 Cheila Modeer, 1793: synonym of Cheilea Modeer, 1793 – this is actually in the Hipponicidae, not the Calyptraeidae
 Clypeola Gray, 1868: synonym of Sigapatella Lesson, 1831
 Crypta Gray, 1847: synonym of Crepidula Lamarck, 1799
 Dispotaea Say, 1824: synonym of Crucibulum Schumacher, 1817
 Galerus Gray, 1847 : synonym of Calyptraea Lamarck, 1799
 Garnotia Gray, 1857: synonym of Crepidula Lamarck, 1799
 Ianacus Mörch, 1852: synonym of Crepidula Lamarck, 1799
 Siphopatella Lesson, 1831: synonym of Syphopatella Lesson, 1831; synonym ofCrepidula Lamarck, 1799 (unjustified emendation of Syphopatella)
 Spirogalerus Finlay & Marwick, 1937 †: synonym of Sigapatella Lesson, 1831
 Syphopatella Lesson, 1831: synonym of Crepidula Lamarck, 1799
 Trochatella Lesson, 1831: synonym of Trochita Schumacher, 1817
 Trochilla Swainson, 1835: synonym of Trochita Schumacher, 1817
 Verticumbo Berry, 1940 †: synonym of Crepipatella Lesson, 1831
 Zeacrypta Finlay, 1926: synonym of Maoricrypta Finlay, 1926
 Zegalerus Finlay, 1927: synonym of Sigapatella Lesson, 1831

References

External links 
 Miocene Gastropods and Biostratigraphy of the Kern River Area, California; United States Geological Survey Professional Paper 642 
 Marshall B.A. 2003. A review of the Recent and Late Cenozoic Calyptraeidae of New Zealand (Mollusca: Gastropoda). The Veliger 46(2): 117-144
 Collin R. 2005. Development, phylogeny, and taxonomy of Bostrycapulus (Caenogastropoda: Calyptraeidae), an ancient cryptic radiation. Zoological Journal of the Linnean Society 144(1): 75-101,
 Hoagland, K.E. 1977. Systematic review of fossil and recent Crepidula and discussion of the evolution of the Calyptraeidae. Malacologia, 16(2): 353-420

 
Gastropod families
Taxa named by Jean-Baptiste Lamarck